The Tinker Building is a historic building in Orlando, Florida located at 16 and 18 West Pine Street. On July 17, 1980, it was added to the U.S. National Register of Historic Places.

References

External links
 Orange County listings at Florida's Office of Cultural and Historical Programs

Buildings and structures in Orlando, Florida
History of Orlando, Florida
National Register of Historic Places in Orange County, Florida